John Mitford may refer to:
John Mitford (Royal Navy officer), British naval officer and writer
John Freeman-Mitford, 1st Baron Redesdale, known as Sir John Mitford between 1793 and 1802
John Mitford (priest) (1781–1859), English man of letters
John de Mitford, MP for Northumberland (UK Parliament constituency)

See also
John Freeman-Mitford (disambiguation)